This is a list of ingredients found in Vietnamese cuisine.

Meat

Insects

Grain and grain-based ingredients

Legume

Vegetables

Spices and herbs

Fruits

Others

See also

 Vietnamese cuisine
 List of Vietnamese culinary specialities
 List of Vietnamese dishes
 Vietnamese noodles

References

External links

Ingredients